Émile Keller (Belfort, 1828 – 1909) was a French writer and politician.

Biography
In 1857 he was elected as a deputy for the Haut-Rhin district to the French Assembly. He soon made himself prominent as a leader of the Roman Catholic Party. He lost his seat in 1863, but was reelected in 1869. He was commander of a company of volunteers during the Franco-Prussian War. After the war, he again joined the Assembly as Haut-Rhin representative in 1871. He made a stirring speech against the cession of Alsace-Lorraine to Germany. When the treaty was signed, he left the Assembly with other Alsatians, but was back as representative for Belfort in 1876, and again in 1885.

Works
Histoire de France (1888)
L'Encyclique et les libertés de l'église gallicane (1860)
L'Encyclique et les principes de 1789 (1865)
Le générale de Lamoricière (1873)
Les congregations religeuses en France (1880)
These works are written from the Catholic point of view and, for this reason, they were long read and popular in Catholic circles.

Notes

References
 
 

1828 births
1909 deaths
Writers from Belfort
French Roman Catholics
Politicians from Belfort
Legitimists
Members of the 2nd Corps législatif of the Second French Empire
Members of the 4th Corps législatif of the Second French Empire
Members of the National Assembly (1871)
Members of the 1st Chamber of Deputies of the French Third Republic
Members of the 2nd Chamber of Deputies of the French Third Republic
Members of the 4th Chamber of Deputies of the French Third Republic
French male writers
French military personnel of the Franco-Prussian War
Place of death missing